Camps may refer to:

People
Ramón Camps (1927–1994), Argentine general
Gabriel Camps (1927–2002), French historian
Luís Espinal Camps (1932–1980), Spanish missionary to Bolivia
Victoria Camps (b. 1941), Spanish philosopher and professor
Josep Piqué i Camps (b. 1955), Spanish politician
Octavia Camps, Uruguayan-American computer scientist
Francisco Camps (b. 1962), Spanish politician
Gerardo Camps, (b. 1963), Spanish politician
Patricio Camps (b. 1972), Argentine footballer

Places
In Argentina:
Estación Camps, village in Entre Ríos Province
In France:
Camps-sur-l'Agly, commune in the Aude department
Camps-en-Amiénois, commune in the Somme department
Camps-la-Source, commune in the Var department
Camps-sur-l'Isle, commune in the Gironde department
Camps-Saint-Mathurin-Léobazel, commune in the Corrèze department

See also
CAMPS, missile defense system for civilian aircraft
Camp (disambiguation)
Campus
Kamps (disambiguation)
Kempes